Konstantin Yuryevich Sukhoverkhov (born 27 December 1987) is a former Russian professional football player.

Club career
He played 5 seasons in the Russian Football National League for FC SKA-Energiya Khabarovsk.

External links
 
 

1987 births
Living people
Russian footballers
Association football forwards
FC SKA-Khabarovsk players
FC Smena Komsomolsk-na-Amure players